The Battle of Mingtiao was a battle between the Shang dynasty and the Xia dynasty, resulting in a Shang victory which created the elevation circumstances of the Duke of Shang to the throne of China.

Background

When the throne of Xia dynasty was passed down to Jie of Xia, the power of the Xia clan was no longer as strong as before. Jie was generally corrupt and irresponsible.  He felt that the original palace was too simple, he ordered for construction of the tilt palace. This palace took seven years and tens of thousands of slaves to build. It also used up huge sums of money. The peasants were resentful.  

Meanwhile, the Shang clan was gaining support from neighbouring tribes. Their ancestor, Qi, had worked for Yu the Great and was given the territory of Shang. During Tang of Shang's reign, due to agricultural development, the Shang was gaining more and more power. Tang allied with nearby tribes and treated his subjects kindly.  He also had the support of Yi Yin. Yi was originally the slave of his father-in-law. When Tang married, Yi Yin became Tang's chef. Yi also analysed the current affairs of the time and became his right-hand man. This was how Yi became known as Yi Yin.

Tang was determined to end the Xia dynasty. He agreed to comply with Jie, but in secret prepared to overthrow him. First, he moved his people to a place named Bo. The area from Bo to the Xia capital was flat, almost without any hills or rivers to stop them. He was also forgiving to his subjects, and was therefore supported by them.

As most of the nobles believed in the supernatural, they believed that worshipping the gods and their ancestors was extremely important. A tribe named Ge, which was geographically near to the Shang clan, did not worship their ancestors on a regular basis. They ate the cattle and sheep which Tang had given them for sacrifices, and killed the children who sent the animals. Tang conquered this tribe, and eliminated a few more. Jie, however, did not realise that Tang was a threat to his throne.

Battle
When a few tribes started rebelling against Xia, Tang of Shang decided that the time had come. He started his attack on Xia. Upon hearing of Tang's rebellion, Jie sent troops from the smaller territories of Gu, Wei, and Kuenwu. Yi advised Tang to put off the fight for a year, then conquered Gu and Wei, and defeated Kuenwu.

Before the army proceeded any further, Yi Yin told Tang that the army needed a boost in morale. Tang gave a speech, known historically as 'Tang's pledge', before the two armies met in Mingtiao (present-day Xia County, North Anyi, Xiyun) around 1600 BC. Tang's generals and soldiers all abhorred Jie, so they fought bravely. On the contrary, Jie's troops, seeing the power of the Shangs, did not listen to his commands. They either surrendered or fled. As a result, the Shangs won the battle and set up the Shang dynasty.

After the battle was won, Jie of Xia sought shelter in Kuenwu. After conquering Kuenwu, Tang of Shang forced Jie into exile in Nanchao (present day Chao, Anhui).  Jie stayed there until his death. Tang then eliminated the remaining Xia forces and used the Xia peasants as slaves.

Legacy
As Tang of Shang was a nobleman, his revolution is considered the first 'noble revolution' in Chinese history. The Shang dynasty, which he founded, was also the second dynasty in Chinese history.

See also
Battle of Muye

References

Shang dynasty
Xia dynasty
Military history of Anhui
16th century BC
2nd-millennium BC conflicts